Tekken is a fighting video game series developed by Namco and published by Namco Bandai. The series debuted in 1994 with the arcade version of Tekken and is one of the genre's and Namco's best-selling franchises, with over 33 million units sold, and is the 30th best-selling franchise of all time.

The games take place in a fictional universe and follow an ongoing story that involves an annual martial arts tournament called The King of Iron Fist Tournament, organised by Mishima Zaibatsu conglomerate owner Heihachi Mishima, in which contestants fight for control of the corporation and prize money. Tekken titles are usually released originally in arcades, before being released on video game consoles a year later; the series is largely exclusive to the PlayStation series of consoles, and the arcade machines run on PlayStation-based hardware.

Related comics, dramatizations and music albums have also been released, and some of the series' recurring characters have also appeared in other Namco games.

Video games

Main series

Spin-offs

Remasters

Crossovers

Other media

Manga

Dramatizations

Music albums

References

Media
Tekken
Tekken